Everest Food Products Pvt Ltd (Everest Spices) is an Indian manufacturer, distributor and exporter of ground spices and spice mixtures under the brand name Everest.

Everest has been accorded the Superbrands status Eight times: in 2003, 2006, 2009, 2012, 2015, 2017, 2019 & 2021. It also won FMCG Consumer Reaction Award. Everest started began advertising aggressively on the television in 2003, and by 2005, it had 30% share of the branded pure spices market in India. According to the 2007 study, Everest was India's largest spices brand based in Mumbai. More than two crore (20 million) households used Everest spices regularly. The brand was stocked by four Lakh (4,00,000) outlets in more than 1,000 towns across India.  More than 370 crore (3.705 billion) packs of Everest product were sold each year. There were more than 42 blends under the Everest brand name.

Everest Spices competes with MDH, which has 12% market share.

References

External links 

 

Food and drink companies based in Mumbai
Agriculture companies established in 1981
Food and drink companies established in 1981
Indian companies established in 1981
Indian brands
1981 establishments in Maharashtra